Eiji is a common masculine Japanese given name.

Possible writings
Eiji can be written using different kanji characters and can mean:

, "prosperity, peace"
, "great, peace"
, "great, second"
, "eternity, next"

The name can also be written in hiragana or katakana.

The Eiji era ("eternal peace") is a period in the history of Japan, dating from 1141 to 1142 AD. It follows the Hōen era and precedes the Kōji era.

People with the name
, Japanese actor
, Japanese designer and video game director
, Japanese professional wrestler
, Japanese film actor
, Japanese shogi player
, Japanese football goalkeeper
, Japanese industrial designer
, Japanese professional mixed martial artist
, Japanese voice actor
, Japanese boxer
, Japanese film actor
, Japanese conductor
, Japanese businessman
, Japanese volleyball player
, Japanese voice actor
, Japanese footballer
, Japanese chairman of Toyota Motor Corporation
, Japanese special effects director
, Japanese singer and entertainer
, Japanese voice actor
, Japanese historical novelist

Fictional characters
Eiji Asuma, a character in the manga series Psychometrer Eiji
Eiji Date, a character in the manga and anime series Hajime no Ippo
Eiji Hino, a character in the  television series Kamen Rider OOO
Eiji Kamiya, a character in the manga and anime series Wangan Midnight
Eiji Kanda, a character in the manga and anime series Antique Bakery
Eiji Kashii, a character in the light novel and anime series Juni Taisen: Zodiac War
Eiji Kikumaru, a character in the manga and anime series The Prince of Tennis
Eiji Kisaragi, a character in the video game series Art of Fighting and The King of Fighters
Eiji Niizuma, a character in the manga and anime series Bakuman
Eiji Sawakita, a character in the manga and anime series Slam Dunk
Eiji Nochizawa, a character in the anime film Sword Art Online The Movie: Ordinal Scale
Eiji Okumura, a character in the manga and anime series Banana Fish
Eiji Ōtori, a character in the multimedia franchise Uta no Prince-sama
Eiji Takaoka, a character in the  television series GoGo Sentai Boukenger

Japanese masculine given names